Muhammad Zubair (born 12 October 1988) is a Pakistani field hockey player who plays for the Pakistan national team as a forward.

Career

2010
In November, Zubair was part of the gold medal winning team at the Asian Games in Guangzhou, China.

See also

 Pakistan national field hockey team

References

External links
 

Living people
1988 births
Pakistani male field hockey players
Male field hockey forwards
Asian Games gold medalists for Pakistan
Asian Games bronze medalists for Pakistan
Asian Games medalists in field hockey
Field hockey players at the 2006 Asian Games
Field hockey players at the 2010 Asian Games
2006 Men's Hockey World Cup players
2010 Men's Hockey World Cup players
2018 Men's Hockey World Cup players
Olympic field hockey players of Pakistan
Field hockey players at the 2008 Summer Olympics
Commonwealth Games medallists in field hockey
Commonwealth Games silver medallists for Pakistan
Medalists at the 2006 Asian Games
Medalists at the 2010 Asian Games
Field hockey players at the 2006 Commonwealth Games
21st-century Pakistani people
Medallists at the 2006 Commonwealth Games